Donald Jones (born June 5, 1973) is a Republican member of the Ohio House of Representatives, representing the 95th district since January 2019. Jones's district includes all of Carroll, Harrison, and Noble counties and portions of Belmont and Washington counties. Prior to elected office, Jones served as an agricultural education teacher at Harrison Central High School. He also serves as a volunteer firefighter and EMT.

Former State Representative Andy Thompson's term expired at the end of 2018. Thompson had served 8 years in the Ohio House and was term limited per the Ohio Constitution causing an open seat in the 95th district. Unopposed in the Republican primary, Jones went on to win the seat with more than 65% of the vote. He was sworn into office for the first time on January 6, 2019.

In 2021, Jone sponsored legislation to ban the teaching that any individual is “inherently racist,” that any individual “bears responsibility for actions committed in the past by the same race or sex,” or that slavery “constitutes the true founding” of the United States. Jones argued, "Critical race theory is a dangerous and flat-out wrong theory." Asked if any Ohio schools actually teach the things that Jones sought to ban, Jones could not cite any examples.

References

Links 
 Representative Don Jones (official site)

Living people
Republican Party members of the Ohio House of Representatives
21st-century American politicians
1973 births